Johan Moreno (born 10 June 1991) is a Venezuelean footballer. Moreno currently plays for Deportivo Lara, and made one appearance for the Venezuela national football team.

References

External links
 Profile at BDFA
 
 

1991 births
Living people
Venezuelan footballers
Venezuela international footballers
Venezuelan expatriate footballers
Zamora FC players
Atlético El Vigía players
Yaracuyanos FC players
C.D. Antofagasta footballers
Venezuelan Primera División players
Chilean Primera División players
Expatriate footballers in Chile
Venezuelan expatriate sportspeople in Chile
People from Táchira
Association football wingers